Semenigino is a rural locality (a village) in Vakhromeyevskoye Rural Settlement, Kameshkovsky District, Vladimir Oblast, Russia. The population was 16 as of 2010.

Geography 
Semenigino is located 22 km north of Kameshkovo (the district's administrative centre) by road. Mikshino is the nearest rural locality.

References 

Rural localities in Kameshkovsky District